Adam Krzemiński (born 27 January 1945 in Radecznica) is a Polish journalist and commentator, frequently featured on German television and radio, specialized in German-Polish relations and history. Considered "one of the leading publicists of Poland", he has been editor of the Polish weekly Polityka since 1973, has been guest editor of the German weekly Die Zeit and has written for many other international publications. His books include Polen im 20. Jahrhundert: ein historischer Essay (Munich: Beck, 1993).

Krzemiński was awarded the Goethe Medal in 1993 and the Essay Prize of the Polish P.E.N. Club in 1996. Krzeminski is Chairman of the German-Polish Association.

References

1945 births
Living people
Polish journalists
Commanders Crosses of the Order of Merit of the Federal Republic of Germany